Qareh Guz-e Il (also Romanized as Qareh Gūz-e Īl; also known as Qarāgūz-e 'Īl) is a village in Nazluy-ye Jonubi Rural District, in the Central District of Urmia County, West Azerbaijan Province, Iran. At the 2006 census, its population was 211, in 65 families.

References 

Populated places in Urmia County